Filimonovskaya is a rural locality (a village) in Spasskoye Rural Settlement, Tarnogsky District, Vologda Oblast, Russia. The population was 69 as of 2002.

Geography 
Filimonovskaya is located 23 km northwest of Tarnogsky Gorodok (the district's administrative centre) by road. Nizhnepauninskaya is the nearest rural locality.

References 

Rural localities in Tarnogsky District